Rafael D. Almeida (July 30, 1887 – March 19, 1968) was a Major League Baseball third baseman from 1911 to 1913 with the Cincinnati Reds.

Almeida and Armando Marsans debuted together with the Reds on July 4, 1911. They are sometimes named the first major league players born in Cuba, which is incorrect because Havana-born Chick Pedroes played in the National League in 1902; in addition, Cuban-born Steve Bellán played from 1871 to 1873 in the National Association of Professional Base Ball Players (NA), a league whose status as a major league is disputed.

Six years before Cincinnati, Almeida and Marsans both played "Negro baseball" in the United States as 1905 members of the integrated All Cubans.

Almeida played winter baseball in the Cuban League from 1904 to 1925 and was one of ten players elected to the Cuban Baseball Hall of Fame in its 1939 inaugural class.

Notes

References
.
Riley, James A. (2002). The Biographical Encyclopedia of the Negro Baseball Leagues. 2nd edition. New York: Carroll & Graf Publ. .

External links

1887 births
1968 deaths
Baseball players from Havana
Cincinnati Reds players
Major League Baseball players from Cuba
Cuban expatriate baseball players in the United States
Major League Baseball third basemen
New Britain Perfectos players
Azul (baseball) players
Carmelita players
Montreal Royals players
Scranton Miners players